The Butterfly's Dream can refer to:

 The Butterfly's Dream (1994 film), a 1994 Italian film
 The Butterfly's Dream (2013 film), a 2013 Turkish film

See also
 "The Butterfly Dream", a story from the 3rd century BC Chinese text Zhuangzi